Phiriye Dao is a Bengali language action drama film directed by Chiranjeet Chakraborty. This film was released in 1994 in the banner of Tirupati films. Music of the film was composed by Bappi Lahiri.

Plot
Three dacoits attack a police van and loot bank money. A photographer snaps all their faces. While dacoits chase him, the photographer hide it in Mr. Choudhury's house. Those daciots kill Mr. Choudhury and his invalid daughter mercilessly in front of Mrs.Chowdhuri. Their little son Arjun saves himself hiding in the garden. Due to this incident his mother gets a paralytic attack. Child Arjun take shelter in the hut of nearby hill in a compassionate Chinese shopkeeper. He trains marshal art from him and decide to take revenge to the killers. He meets Antara, an actress and comes to Kolkata to search those murderers.

Cast
 Chiranjit as Arjun
 Rakhee Gulzar as Mrs. Choudhury, Arjun's mother
 Satabdi Roy as Antara
 Abhishek Chatterjee as Abhi
 Biplab Chatterjee as Chinese man
 Rabi Ghosh
 Pallavi Chatterjee
 Dilip Roy as Mr. Choudhury/Arjun's father
 Dulal Lahiri
 Sreela Majumdar
 Master Rintu as Child Arjun
 Soumitra Bannerjee
 Rathin Basu
 Ranjit Bhattacharya
 Gouri Sankar Panda

References

External links
 

1994 films
1990s action drama films
Bengali-language Indian films
Indian action drama films
Films scored by Bappi Lahiri
1990s Bengali-language films
1994 drama films